Belaïd Abrika (born December 10, 1969 in Tizi Ouzou) is a professor of economics at the Mouloud Mammeri University of Tizi-Ouzou. He has become one of the best-known modern Kabyles through his role as a leader and spokesperson of the Arouch (Comité des Âarouchs, Daïras et communes or CADC) protest movement in the region of Kabylie in Algeria.

He has been arrested several times because of his association with Arouch. In September 2003 he was arrested and beaten by police during a protest of recent government actions to suppress independent newspapers. On August 10, 2004, Abrika was arrested again by Tizi-Ouzou police during a protest at a hospital. He was imprisoned for 28 days.

References 

1969 births
Living people
People from Tizi Ouzou
Kabyle people
Algerian activists
Algerian dissidents
21st-century Algerian people